Southern Studios is a recording studio in the Wood Green area of London.  It was founded in 1974 by John Loder, and came to be the recording studio of choice for Crass and their record label Crass Records. Southern Studios Ltd. continues to grow its label and provide label management and distribution services throughout Europe.

Background
In the 1980s and 90s, Southern Studios Ltd. (SSL) started a record label and a distribution company. The label used the name Southern Records. The distributor uses the name Southern Record Distributors Ltd. (SRD) and took over UK distribution.  The distributor is now independently owned.

SSL continued to serve the needs of Europe, as well as signing and supporting artists on the Southern Records.

During the massive growth of the independent music industry in the mid-1990s, Loder decided to establish Southern Records Inc. (SRI) in Chicago, which added artists to the roster and operates a distribution business for labels in the US and elsewhere.

Technical details 
Steve Albini, a long-time friend and associate of John Loder, has described the set up at Southern Studios as being completely analogue. Although not entirely analogue, the vintage Raindirk Series III 24-channel desk dominates the studio control room. The studio retained two key time-based signal processors: an EMT 140 plate reverb and an AMS RSX-16 digital
reverb. The studio today is owned by Southern Records and continues to operate under the guidance of sound engineer Harvey Birrell.

Artists
The following is an incomplete list of artists who have recorded at Southern Studios:
And Also The Trees
The Jesus and Mary Chain
Carter USM
Chelsea Wolfe
Crass
Therapy?
My Life With The Thrill Kill Kult
Sonic Youth
Neil Leyton
Mark Stewart & The Maffia
African Head Charge
Big Black
Lee Perry
Shellac
Fugazi
All About Eve
Grails
Shit and Shine
Lungleg
Danielle Howle
Babes In Toyland
Bauhaus
The Fall
Ministry
No Age
Dananananaykroyd
Pulp

Distribution 
The following is an incomplete list of record labels that have been manufactured & distributed or distributed by Southern Studios in Europe between 1978 and the present.
Adult Swim Records
Bluurg Records
Corpus Christi Records
Crass Records
Dischord Records
Ipecac Records
Outer Himalayan Records
Spiderleg Records
Touch & Go Records
Trance Syndicate Records
Wrong Records

See also
 Southern Records
 List of record labels

References

External links
Southern Website

Recording studios in London
British independent record labels
Crass
Record labels established in 1974
Alternative rock record labels